Robyn and Gandeleyn is an English ballad.  The poem is in Sloane Manuscript 2593, a document of lyrics and carols which dates from around 1450.  It was later republished in the second half of the 19th century in an anthology of traditional English and Scottish ballads by Francis James Child known as the Child Ballads, where it is Child Ballad 115. Child also divided the continuous text into seventeen stanzas.

The ballad has attracted interest from scholars of Robin Hood due to the similarity of Robyn's name and the involvement of precise archery as a theme.  Despite this similarity, Child believed that the ballad is not connected to Robin Hood's legend, a position that other scholars generally concur with due to the seeming lack of relation with Robin Hood's legend in the story.  If it really is a reference to Robin Hood, it would be one of the earliest attested stories, along with Robin Hood and the Monk.

Synopsis

Robyn kills a deer, but is then shot and killed by an arrow.  His servant Gandeleyn looks about for the killer and finds Wrennok of Donne, a young archer (described as a "little boy").  They exchange words, and Gandeleyn says they shall shoot at a mark of each other's hearts.  Wrennok fires first but his shot misses.  Gandeleyn fires second and cleaves his heart in two, killing Wrennok.  The ballad concludes with Gandeleyn declaring Wrennok cannot boast of killing both Robyn and his servant.

Interpretations
In general, most scholars believe the Robyn in this ballad to be unrelated to the more famous Robin Hood.  There appear to be more differences than similarities between Robyn and Gandeleyn and Robin and Little John.  Despite the belief it is unlikely to be directly related, the ballad is often included in collections of Robin Hood literature due to being a relevant example of folklore of perceptions of the medieval greenwood as a place of sudden violence and duels over affairs of honor.

Other opinions have been offered as well, often suggesting that the Robyn described may have been a poacher and thus the ballad was about poaching.  The author Robert Graves offered the eccentric view that the ballad was really about birds, and described the New Year's hunting of a wren in vengeance for a robin (the bird) murdered in midsummer.

References

External links
Robyn and Gandelyn with commentary

Child Ballads
Robin Hood ballads
Sloane Manuscript 2593
Middle English poems
15th-century poems